Death in Brunswick is a 1990 Australian black comedy/romance starring Sam Neill, Zoe Carides and John Clarke. It is based on the 1987 comic novel of the same name by Boyd Oxlade.

At the APRA Music Awards of 1991, "Death in Brunswick" won Film Score of the Year.

Plot
Set and filmed in Brunswick, a Melbourne suburb, it deals with a humble chef, Carl (Neill) who gets a job at a sleazy nightclub owned by Yanni Voulgaris (Nicholas Papademetriou).  He begins a relationship with the Greek-Australian barmaid, Sophie (Zoe Carides), which soon brings him into trouble with his employers and her strict father. His drug dealing Turkish-Australian co-worker, Mustafa (Nick Lathouris), is beaten up by the Greek-Australian owners.  Thinking Carl told them, Mustafa attacks Carl.  Carl accidentally stabs and kills him.

He calls his friend, Dave (John Clarke), a grave digger, and they bury Mustafa. This leads to one of the most famous scenes in the film—Dave's idea that they bury the body in the opened grave of someone else whose husband will be buried above her the following day. Dave expects the coffin of the deceased to be comparatively empty, given how long it has been since she died. When he finds that the rate of decomposition is not what he expects, he begins to stomp and crush her body to make some room.

Later, Mustafa's wife and son come to the restaurant and ask Carl if they know what happened to Mustafa. Carl denies having any knowledge and is wracked with guilt.  He gives Mustafa's pay to his wife, even though Dave tells him that it might make him suspect.  Later Mustafa's son sees him at a pool with Sophie.  Knowing that Sophie is also having a relationship with one of the Greek owners, Mustafa's Turkish friends confront Carl.

Believing the Greek owners to be responsible, they get their revenge on them, ironically killing the one who was originally responsible for beating Mustafa in the first place.  Carl leaves his job and is later comforted when he sees Mustafa in the church (albeit, in a dream) who offers him a friendly handshake. After his domineering mother suffers a stroke and is left a quadriplegic, Carl marries Sophie, despite her father's protests and the final scene from their wedding is reminiscent of the Last Supper.

Cast  
Zoe Carides as Sophie Papafagos 
John Clarke as Dave 
Yvonne Lawley as Mrs Fitzgerald 
Sam Neill as Carl Fitzgerald 
Nicholas Papademetriou as Yanni Voulgaris
Deborah Kennedy as June
Doris Younane as Carmel

Production
The film was shot from 15 January to 5 March 1990.

Soundtrack
The original music score was composed and produced by New Zealand-born musician Philip Judd.

Reception 
David Stratton and Margaret Pomeranz, film critics for The Movie Show awarded the film four-and-a-half stars out of five. Stratton described the film as "a black comedy which isn't afraid to take risks, to shift moods, to push to the limit".

Sydney Morning Herald film critic, Rob Lowing praised the performances of Sam Neill, Zoe Carides and John Clarke. Lowing described the film as "a gem of a black comedy and certainly the best that Australia has produced in years".

Box office
Death in Brunswick grossed $2,725,169 at the box office in Australia, which is equivalent to $5,490,566
in 2021 dollars. It was the second highest-grossing Australian film of the year behind Green Card.

See also
Cinema of Australia
 Scott Murray (editor), Australian Film, 1978-1994, Oxford, 1995. 
 Helen Martin & Sam Edwards, New Zealand Film 1912-1996 p198 (1997, Oxford University Press, Auckland)

References

External links

 Death in Brunswick at National Film and Sound Archive
Death in Brunswick at Oz Movies

1990 films
1990 debut singles
APRA Award winners
Australian comedy films
Films set in Melbourne
Films shot in Melbourne
1990s English-language films